The Ministry of Environment and Climate Change was established by a ministerial decision attended by Sheikh Tamim bin Hamad Al Thani, Emir of the State No. 57 of 2021. The Ministry of Environment and Climate Change is a service ministry that specializes in achieving many goals, foremost of which is protecting the environment, preserving its resources, and reducing emissions that cause climate change.

The current Minister is Faleh bin Nasser bin Ahmed bin Ali Al Thani.

Ministry tasks 
The Ministry of Environment and Climate Change is concerned with everything related to the affairs of the environment and climate change, and in particular it shall have the following:

 Propose and implement public policies to protect the environment and reduce emissions that cause climate change.
 Conducting and evaluating the studies necessary to protect the environment.
 Supporting and developing institutions that work on developing public awareness about the importance of preserving and protecting the environment.
 Encouraging the use of technological developments to support and protect the environment.
 Development of wildlife and marine life, protection of their natural habitats, and follow up of related activities.
 Controlling the handling of chemical and radioactive materials, and managing radioactive waste, follow up on the peaceful uses of nuclear energy.
 Promote the environmentally friendly uses of treated wastewater and recycled solid waste.
 Issuing environmental licenses for industrial development projects.
 Monitoring industrial environmental violations and conducting the necessary inspections
 Managing and supervising nature reserves.

Source:

References 

Government of Qatar
Government ministries of Qatar
Climate change ministries
Ministries established in 2021
2021 establishments in Qatar
Climate action plans